Gurugram Metropolitan Development Authority (GMDA) is a government body that looks after the development and maintenance of Gurugram (erstwhile Gurgaon) city. It is responsible for the urban planning, infrastructure and mobility of the city.

Partnerships 

 Partnered with Cisco's to for managing city infrastructure in a unified way

References 

Government departments of Haryana